Sesleriella is a genus of Alpine plants in the grass family .

Sesleriella is closely related to Sesleria and included within that genus in some publications.

Species
Sesleriella leucocephala (DC.) Deyl - Switzerland, Italy, Austria, Slovenia
Sesleriella sphaerocephala (Ard.) Deyl - Italy, Austria, Slovenia

References

External links
Grassbase - The World Online Grass Flora

Pooideae
Poaceae genera